Wolfgang Scheidel (born 1 March 1943) is an East German former luger who won the gold medal in the men's singles event at the 1972 Winter Olympics in Sapporo. He also won three medals at the FIL World Luge Championships with one gold in the men's doubles (1965) and two bronzes in the men's singles (1969, 1970). He won a pair of silver medals in the men's singles event at the FIL European Luge Championships (1970, 1971).

After retiring from competitions Scheidel trained young lugers at ASK Oberhof until 1977, and after that worked as a sports instructor in a recreation home of the National People's Army. After the German reunification he ran an oxygen station in his home town of Ilmenau.

References

External links

DatabaseOlympics.com information on Scheidel
Fuzilogik Sports – Winter Olympic results – Men's luge
Hickoksports.com results on Olympic champions in luge and skeleton.
Hickok sports information on World champions in luge and skeleton.
List of European luge champions 

1943 births
Living people
Sportspeople from Erfurt
German male lugers
Lugers at the 1968 Winter Olympics
Lugers at the 1972 Winter Olympics
Olympic gold medalists for East Germany
Olympic lugers of East Germany
Olympic medalists in luge
National People's Army military athletes
Medalists at the 1972 Winter Olympics
20th-century German people